Darren Cahill and John Fitzgerald were the defending champions but they competed with different partners that year, Cahill with Mark Kratzmann and Fitzgerald with Simon Youl.

Fitzgerald and Youl lost in the first round to Peter Doohan and Laurie Warder.

Cahill and Kratzmann lost in the final 6–3, 6–7, 7–5 to David Pate and Scott Warner.

Seeds

  Darren Cahill /  Mark Kratzmann (final)
  Peter Doohan /  Laurie Warder (quarterfinals)
  Brad Drewett /  Wally Masur (first round)
  Eric Jelen /  Carl-Uwe Steeb (first round)

Draw

External links
1989 Australian Indoor Championships Doubles Draw

Doubles